Pawel Jefimowitsch Kassatkin  - 19 May 1987) was a Soviet poet.

Early life 

He was the 6th child.

Childhood was characterized by poverty and a rural life. He lost his mother early in life and as a consequence was cared for by his step-mother. He completed his schooling at the agricultural school in Bobow. Soon after, he moved to Leningrad for further studies.

In 1936 Kassatkin was awarded his Doctors Degree, from the Leningrad Medical Technical School. Immediately after this, he was transferred and served in the Red Army, where he remained until his retirement in Mongolia (1948).

Pawel Kassatkin worked at the front in the Japanese-Soviet War as a field doctor in the rank of feldsher. As a participant in the Japanese-Soviet conflict, he rescued soldiers from both conflict parties.

During this time, in 1938, he wrote his first poems.

Parts of his first works were printed in Irkutsk in 1942 and Ulan-Ude in 1947. Later, they were published throughout the USSR. 
After his departure from the army in 1948 he moved to Voronezh. He worked there until 1950 as a head doctor of the medical point in Bobrow. Following this period, he started working as a journalist for various local newspapers.
In 1953 his first book "Rodnaja Step" appeared with his own works. Subsequently, more books and poems followed. 
In 1958 he finished the party university of the Communist Party of the Soviet Union (C.P.S.U.).

In 1960, Kassatkin was appointed to the Writers' Union of the USSR after personal invitation from the board leader and in 1975 he was awarded with the Order of the Badge of Honour (Russian: Орден "Знак Почёта") for his merits for local and Soviet literature.

On 19 May 1987, Kassatkin died of Cancer in his hometown of Voronezh.

Personal life 
While studying together, Kassatkin met his future wife Antonina Magazinskaja (1919–2014) and they married on 13 October 1938. They remained married until his death in 1987.
In 1939 his first child, Edward Pavlovich, was born in Mongolia.
His second child, Tamara Pavlovna, was born in Voronezh in 1951.

Works 
From his journalistic activity and his travels through native territories, Kassatkin drew on his creative inspiration.
Therefore, he was also described by critics as "singer of the homeland" (Russian "Певец родной край").
His works were compared with the works of the local writer and poet Aleksey Koltsov (1809–1842).

Awards

Military Awards 
 1945 Medal "For the Victory over Japan" (Russian: Медаль «За победу над Японией»)
 1945 Medal for Battle Merit (Russian: Медаль «За Воееьне Заслуги»)
 1948 Mongolian Medal "For the Victory over Japan" (Mongolian: «бугд найрамдах монгол ард улс. Японыг Ялсны Тфлфф Медал»)
 1981 Merit medal for the battle at Chalchin Gol (Mongolian: «Халхын Голын Яалат Медалийн Унзмлзх»)
 1985 Order of the Patriotic War (Russian: «Орден Отечественной войны»)

Civil Awards 
 1972 Badge for Excellent student of cultural patronage of the USSR (Russian: Знак «Отличник культурного шефства над вооруженными силами СССР»)
 1975 Order of the Badge of Honour (Russian: Орден «Знак Почёта»)

Books  
 Rodnaja Step, The Voronezh Book Publishing House, Voronezh, 1953 
 Pridonje, The Voronezh Book Publishing House, Voronezh, 1959
 Salatoi Liwin, The Voronezh Book Publishing House, Voronezh, 1961
 Woroneschki Pluessi, The Voronezh Book Publishing House, Voronezh, 1963
 Simnaja Skaska, Central-Chernozem books publishers, Voronezh, 1965
 Semla Kolzowa, Books publishers <<Sovjetskaja Russia>>, Moskau, 1965
 Stepnaja Raduga, Central-Chernozem books publishers, Voronezh, 1967
 Monolog Wisnij, Central-Chernozem books publishers, Voronezh, 1970
 Solowje, Central-Chernozem books publishers, Voronezh, 1973
 Na Lugu, Central-Chernozem books publishers, Voronezh, 1975
 Moe Pole, Central-Chernozem books publishers, Voronezh, 1979, Library of Congress-Class.:      PG3482.5.S29 M6 
 Swoei Tropinkoi, Central-Chernozem books publishers, Voronezh, 1984, Library of Congress-Class.:      MLCS 84/13319 (P) 
 Sapawednaja Strana, Central-Chernozem books publishers, Voronezh, 1987

Music 
 Balalaika Russian "Балалайка»
 Peznja o Woronesche Russian "Песня о Воронеже»
 Peznja o Manukowzach Russian "Песня о мануковцах»

External links 

 Svoei tropinkoi in Open Library
 Moe Pole in Open Library
 Short biography published in "Woronesch Guide" (Russian)
 Writers of the region Bobrow, Kassatkin, P.J. (Russian)
 Voronezh writers -Participants in the Great Patriotic War-, S.16 / 29 (Russian / Powerpoint-Document)
 "List of all Books".  Russian national library. 2017. (Russian)
 Medal for Battle Merit 1945 (Russian)
 Russian National Library (Russian)

References 

1915 births
1987 deaths
Soviet poets